Ematheudes kenyaensis is a species of snout moth in the genus Ematheudes. It was described by Jay C. Shaffer in 1998 and is known from Kenya, from which its species epithet is derived.

References

Moths described in 1998
Anerastiini